Exaerete is a genus of euglossine bees found from Mexico to northern Argentina. Like all orchid bees, they are restricted to the Neotropics. All but one species is metallic green, and they are cleptoparasites in the nests of other euglossines in the genera Eufriesea and Eulaema. It contains the following species:
 Exaerete azteca Moure, 1964
 Exaerete dentata (Linnaeus, 1758)
 Exaerete fallaciosa Engel, 2018
 Exaerete frontalis (Guérin-Méneville, 1845)
 Exaerete kimseyae Oliviera, 2011
 Exaerete lepeletieri Oliviera & Nemesio, 2003
 Exaerete salsai Nemesio, 2011
 Exaerete smaragdina (Guérin-Méneville, 1845)
 Exaerete tricosa Engel & Bembé, 2020
 Exaerete trochanterica (Friese, 1900)

References

External links
 David Roubik (Smithsonian Tropical Research Institute): Diagnostic photographs of several Exaerete species

 
Bee genera
Hymenoptera of North America
Hymenoptera of South America
Euglossini
Orchid pollinators